Oreopanax impolitus is a species of plant in the family Araliaceae. It is endemic to Ecuador.  Its natural habitat is subtropical or tropical moist montane forests. It is threatened by habitat loss.

References

impolitus
Endemic flora of Ecuador
Endangered plants
Taxonomy articles created by Polbot